Fonderie Nationale des Bronzes was a 19th– and 20th–century artistic studio and foundry in Brussels, Belgium, that specialized in bronze sculptures. It became known for casting the works of Auguste Rodin, Rembrandt Bugatti, Paul Delvaux, and many others.

Works
Several works by various artists are located in noted museums around the world, including the Musée d'Orsay in Paris.

 A statue of William the Silent (1920) on the campus of Rutgers University in New Brunswick, New Jersey, cast by Toon Dupuis from a mould by Lodewyk Royer.

References

Foundries
Studios in Belgium
Buildings and structures in Brussels
Cultural organisations based in Belgium
19th century in Brussels
20th century in Brussels
Organisations based in Brussels
Belgian art
European sculpture
History of sculpture
Metal companies of Belgium